Munaf Ramadan (born 19 October 1972) is a Syrian former professional footballer who played as a  forward.

Club career
Ramadan started his career at a young age with Saraqib and Al-Hurriya, then he transferred to Jableh where his first tournament was the 1988 Arab Club Champions Cup scoring his first goals against Al-Shabab, Al-Wehdat and Al-Rasheed.

Ramadan won the Syrian Premier League twice with Jableh in 1988 and 1989. Afterwards, he went to play in Kuwait for Al-Yarmouk and Al-Jahra. According to Ramadan, he had the opportunity to transfer to Anorthosis to participate in the 1995–96 UEFA Champions League qualifications, but a problem with his contract in Kuwait prevented him from making the move.

Back to Jableh, Ramadan won his third Syrian League in 2000, ending his career in 2002.

International career
Ramadan was called to play for Syria in 1988 AFC Asian Cup, and Syria U20 in 1989 FIFA World Youth Championship and 1991 FIFA World Youth Championship in which he scored against Uruguay U20 and England U20, only losing on penalties to Australia U20 in the Quarter-finals.

Personal life
His son, Ammar Ramadan, is also a footballer.

References

External links
 

1972 births
Living people
Syrian footballers
Association football forwards
Syria international footballers
Hurriya SC players
Al Jahra SC players
1988 AFC Asian Cup players
Syrian Premier League players
Al-Yarmouk SC (Kuwait) players
Syrian expatriate sportspeople in Kuwait
Kuwait Premier League players
Expatriate footballers in Kuwait